E265 can refer to:
European route E265, a European route
Dehydroacetic acid, a chemical compound